Santeri Paloniemi (born November 8, 1993) is a Finnish alpine skier.

Paloniemi's strongest event is the slalom. Before the 2014 season, he has finished in the top 30 in points in FIS Alpine Ski World Cup four times.

Paloniemi represents Ruka Slalom on club level, and is coached by his father, Martti Paloniemi.

References

1993 births
Living people
Finnish male alpine skiers
Alpine skiers at the 2014 Winter Olympics
Olympic alpine skiers of Finland